Carmela Corleone (1897–1959) is a fictional character in Mario Puzo's 1969 novel The Godfather. Carmela is portrayed by Italian-American Morgana King in Francis Ford Coppola's 1972 film adaptation of the novel, and in The Godfather Part II (1974).

She and her husband Vito, a crime boss, have four children: Santino ("Sonny"), Frederico ("Fredo"), and Michael, and one daughter Constanzia ("Connie").

Background
Carmela was born in Sicily in 1897 and emigrated to the United States shortly after the turn of the century. She married Vito Corleone in 1915; they were married for 40 years until Vito's death in 1955. They had four children – Sonny, Fredo, Michael and Connie. They also took in Sonny's friend Tom Hagen, who later served as the family consigliere.

In the book, Carmela Corleone is portrayed as a traditional Italian immigrant woman who speaks in very broken English.  In the movies, however, she speaks fluent English as an adult, with a marked New York accent.  In the novel, she develops a close relationship with Michael's girlfriend and future wife, Kay. She is given more expansive dialogue in The Godfather Part II, notably when she confronts her daughter Connie about her behavior early in the film, and when she discusses family life with Michael, who fears that his role as Don of the Corleone criminal empire will cost him his family.  Carmela Corleone dies toward the end of the sequel.

Carmela was disturbed by Vito's change from a kind, quiet young man to a pragmatic and ruthless criminal. However Carmela seems to forgive Vito for his many crimes, because he remains essentially a good man who is devoted to his family. Devoutly Catholic, Carmela attends Mass every day to pray for her husband's soul to keep him from "going down there."

In  The Godfather Part IIs flashback scenes, the young Carmela is portrayed by Francesca De Sapio.

Her first name is almost never mentioned, in either the movies or the book, though it is referenced in the sequel books.

Sequel novel
Carmela is a major character in the 2012 prequel novel The Family Corleone, which portrays their early years together raising a family as Vito becomes a crime boss.

Family members

 Vito Corleone—Husband; played by Marlon Brando in The Godfather, played by Robert De Niro in The Godfather Part II
 Santino "Sonny" Corleone—Eldest son; played by James Caan
 Tom Hagen—informally adopted son, played by Robert Duvall
 Frederico "Fredo" Corleone—Middle son; played by John Cazale
 Michael Corleone—Youngest son; played by Al Pacino
 Constanzia "Connie" Corleone—Daughter; played by Talia Shire
 Frank Corleone—Grandson 
 Santino Corleone, Jr.—Grandson
 Francesca Corleone—Granddaughter, twin of Kathryn Corleone
 Kathryn Corleone—Granddaughter, twin of Francesca Corleone
 Vincent Mancini—Grandson; played by Andy García
 Anthony Corleone—Grandson; played by Franc D'Ambrosio
 Mary Corleone—Granddaughter; played by Sofia Coppola
 Victor Rizzi—Grandson
 Michael Rizzi—Grandson

References

The Godfather characters
Fictional immigrants to the United States
Fictional Italian American people
Fictional Sicilian people
Characters in American novels of the 20th century
Characters in American novels of the 21st century
Female characters in literature
Female characters in film
Literary characters introduced in 1969
Cultural depictions of the Mafia
Fictional people from the 19th-century
Fictional people from the 20th-century
Film characters introduced in 1972